The 2003 Premier League speedway season was the second division of speedway in the United Kingdom and governed by the Speedway Control Board (SCB), in conjunction with the British Speedway Promoters' Association (BSPA).

Season summary
The League consisted of 18 teams for the 2003 season with the addition of the King's Lynn Stars who dropped down from the Elite League. 

The League was run on a standard format with no play-offs and was won by Edinburgh Monarchs.

Final table

Premier League Knockout Cup
The 2003 Premier League Knockout Cup was the 36th edition of the Knockout Cup for tier two teams. Isle of Wight Islanders  were the winners of the competition.

First round

Second round

Quarter-finals

Semi-finals

Final

Final
First leg

Second leg

Isle of Wight were declared Knockout Cup Champions, winning on aggregate 95–91.

Leading averages

Riders & final averages
Arena Essex

Joonas Kylmäkorpi 9.69
Leigh Lanham 9.67
Kelvin Tatum 8.39
David Ruud 7.76
Henning Bager 6.96
Joel Parsons 6.00
Lee Herne 5.94
Jason King 4.74
Daniel King 3.82
Andy Galvin 3.65

Berwick

Michal Makovský 7.81
Paul Bentley 7.76
David Meldrum 7.28
Josef Franc 7.03
Adrian Rymel 6.88
Claus Kristensen 6.86
Carlos Villar 5.23
Rob Grant Jr. 4.22

Edinburgh

Frede Schott 10.11 
Peter Carr 9.00
Magnus Karlsson 7.58 
Rory Schlein 7.55 
Theo Pijper 6.33
Wayne Carter 4.77
Matthew Wethers 3.84
Barry Campbell 2.78

Exeter

Michael Coles 8.48 
Seemond Stephens 8.05 
Mark Simmonds 6.92
Lee Smethills 6.71
Scott Smith 6.34
Krister Marsh 5.82
Roger Lobb 5.11
Corey Blackman 3.76

Glasgow

George Štancl 9.38
James Grieves 8.72
Kevin Doolan 6.37
Les Collins 6.21
Christian Henry 5.19
David McAllan 4.56
Trent Leverington 4.22
Ross Brady 2.40

Hull

Paul Thorp 7.98 
Garry Stead 7.39 
Bjorn Hansen 6.58
Shaun Tacey 6.28
Neil Collins 6.26
Lee Dicken 4.66
Simon Cartwright 4.61
Barrie Evans 3.87

Isle of Wight

Adam Shields 9.99 
Danny Bird 8.95
Ray Morton 8.87
Sebastien Trésarrieu 6.34
Glen Phillips 4.67
Gary Phelps 4.18
Chris Mills 4.05
Mathieu Trésarrieu 3.38

King's Lynn

Shane Parker 9.59
Tom P. Madsen 9.54
Davey Watt 9.44
Tomáš Topinka 9.40
Trevor Harding 5.49
Adam Allott 5.47
James Brundle 4.61
Darren Mallett 2.86
Mark Thompson 2.33

Newcastle

Bjarne Pedersen 10.17
Kenneth Bjerre 9.80 
Stuart Robson 8.69
Kevin Little 7.73
Richard Juul 5.49
Lee Dicken 5.42
William Lawson 4.93
Kristian Lund 4.44
Jamie Robertson 4.27
Craig Branney 3.87
Steffen Mell 2.71

Newport

Craig Watson 9.17 
Niels Kristian Iversen 9.13
Frank Smart 8.39
Tony Atkin 6.98
Carl Wilkinson 4.98
Chris Schramm 4.76
Joel Parsons 2.84
Karl Mason 1.56

Reading

Janusz Kołodziej 8.95
Andrew Appleton 7.67
Phil Morris 7.09
Jonas Davidsson 6.19
Scott Smith 5.80
Paul Clews 5.30
Danny King 4.32
Shane Colvin 4.25
Joel Parsons 3.79
Danny Norton 1.27

Rye House

Edward Kennett 7.82
Scott Robson 7.62
Brent Werner 7.07
Nigel Sadler 6.32
Brett Woodifield 6.14
David Mason 5.14
Mark Courtney 5.08

Sheffield

Sean Wilson 9.48 
Andre Compton 8.54 
Ricky Ashworth 7.57
Andrew Moore 7.54
Scott Smith 6.86
Ross Brady .5.79
James Birkinshaw 5.13
Richard Hall .4.93
Ben Wilson 3.81

Somerset

Mark Lemon 8.03
Glenn Cunningham 7.10
Marián Jirout 6.63
Matt Read 6.40
Steve Bishop 6.21
Graeme Gordon 5.89
Stephan Katt 5.33
Rob Finlow 3.77
James Mann 3.03
Simon Dyminski 2.84
Paul Candy 0.67

Stoke

Jan Staechmann 8.92 
Robbie Kessler 8.00
Paul Pickering 8.00
Scott Smith 6.72
Alan Mogridge 6.43
Jon Armstrong 5.79
Rob Grant Jr. 4.84
Joe Cook 2.69
Nick Simmons 2.55

Swindon

Charlie Gjedde 9.60 
Oliver Allen 8.92
Chris Neath 7.80
Paul Fry 7.38
Jamie Smith 5.84
Malcolm Holloway 4.60
Ritchie Hawkins 4.14
Tommy Allen 2.80

Trelawny

Chris Harris 9.33
Matej Žagar 9.12
Pavel Ondrašík 8.02 
Steve Masters 7.48
Mirko Wolter 6.45
Emiliano Sanchez 6.33
Richard Wolff 4.77
Simon Phillips 4.10
Malcolm Holloway 4.10
Tom Brown 2.60

Workington

Carl Stonehewer 9.68
Simon Stead 9.47
Rusty Harrison 7.23
Kauko Nieminen 5.70
Blair Scott 4.85
Aidan Collins 4.75
Chris Collins 3.36

See also
List of United Kingdom Speedway League Champions
Knockout Cup (speedway)

References

Speedway Premier League
2003 in speedway
2003 in British motorsport